The Portuguese House of Burgundy or the Afonsine Dynasty (Dinastia Afonsina) was a Portuguese dynasty that ruled the Kingdom of Portugal from its founding until the 1383–85 Portuguese Interregnum.

The house was founded by Henry of Burgundy, who became Count of Portugal in 1096. His son, Afonso Henriques, was proclaimed King of Portugal following his victory at the Battle of Ourique in 1139. Burgundian monarchs would rule Portugal through much of its early formation, including the formalization of the Portuguese language under King Dinis I, the first Portuguese parliament, under King Afonso II, and the conquest of the Kingdom of the Algarve, under King Afonso III. Numerous princes of the house took up thrones across Europe, such as Ferdinand I, Count of Flanders and Peter I, Count of Urgell. Similarly, many princesses became royal consorts, including Berengaria, Queen of Denmark, Leonor, Queen of Aragon, and  Teresa, Duchess of Burgundy, among others.

History

Origins 
Henry, Count of Portugal, a grandson in the senior line of Robert I, Duke of Burgundy, had joined the Reconquista in the Iberian Peninsula in the late 11th century. After conquering parts of Galicia and northern Portugal on behalf of Alfonso VI of León, he married Alfonso's illegitimate daughter, Teresa, and was given the County of Portugal as a fief under the Kingdom of León.
 
His son, Afonso Henriques, became King of Portugal after defeating his mother in the Battle of São Mamede in 1128. It was only in 1179 that Pope Alexander III recognized Portugal as an independent state, recognition, at the time, needed for total acceptance of the kingdom in the Christian world.

On his mother's side, Afonso I of Portugal is connected to the Jiménez dynasty, and through Sancha of León, to the Astur-Leonese dynasty, making him a descendant of Pelagius of Asturias. As the Chronicle of Alfonso III identifies Pelagius as a grandson of Chindasuinth, this would make Afonso I the descendant of Liuvigild. Liuvigild was King of the Visigoths in the 6th Century a.C. (see Visigothic dynasty), who conquered the Suebi Kingdom, thus controlling most of the Iberian Peninsula (and all of what would be Portugal, - see Visigothic Kingdom). On his father's side, Afonso I of Portugal is connected to the Capetian dynasty, a branch of the Frankish Robertians that goes back to Robert II, Count of Hesbaye in the 9th a.C.

Kings of Portugal 

The kings that succeeded Afonso I continued the Reconquista of the Iberian Peninsula against the Moors. Afonso III conquered the Algarve and adopted the title of King of Portugal and the Algarve.

The borders of Portugal were defined in the Treaty of Alcanizes (1297) when king Dinis I, son of Afonso III, started developing the kingdom's land.

Demise 
In 1383 Beatrice, princess of Portugal and heir to the throne married John I of Castile. When Ferdinand I (her father) died during the same year the kingdom entered a period of anarchy called the 1383-1385 Crisis, threatened with a possible annexation by Castile.

This period ended in 1385 with the victory of the Portuguese in the Battle of Aljubarrota and a new dynasty began with John I, Master of Aviz (illegitimate son of Peter I), thus called the House of Aviz.

Burgundian monarchs

Symbols

Coats of arms

Family tree of the Portuguese House of Burgundy

See also
 List of Portuguese monarchs
 House of Aviz
 Portugal in the Middle Ages
 Timeline of Portuguese history

Footnotes

External links
(Portuguese) The Portuguese monarchs of Burgundy and their history

 
1139 establishments in Europe
1383 disestablishments in Europe
14th-century disestablishments in Portugal
12th-century establishments in Portugal

gl:Dinastía de Borgoña